The Manchester Boys Choir was founded in 1981 by Adrian P. Jessett and quickly gained a reputation as one of the finest boys' choirs in the world.  It prided itself on producing the finest voices without the need for auditioning.  From 1996 to 2003 it held the title as the Choir in Residence at The Bridgewater Hall and performed before the Queen on the Hall's opening night.

Since its foundation, the choir has performed at venues all over the UK including the Royal Albert Hall, The Royal Concert Hall (Glasgow), The London Palladium (for the Children's Royal Variety Performance), The Barbican and the Royal Festival Hall. For many years the choir travelled to the Costwolds in the spring for a training week, performing a number of concerts across the area in the process.

The Choir has won the prestigious Llangollen International Eisteddfod (twice) and the UK National Choral Competition, and was a finalist in the Sainsbury's Choir of the Year competition.

Since its foundation, the Manchester Boys Choir has toured to countries including Australia, Finland, Russia, Canada, Austria, Belgium, the Netherlands, Canada, Czechoslovakia, Hong Kong, Singapore and Denmark.

The Choir has worked with the Hallé Orchestra, the BBC Philharmonic and the Manchester Camerata and has performed on radio and television.  The Choir has also produced many high quality soloists for Opera North.

After a tour of Finland, a critic believed it to be a performance from one of the finest boys' choirs in the world. The Manchester Boys Choir has established a worldwide reputation in a short space of time, without need for auditioning boys.  Anyone who wishes to sing has a place in the choir.  New arrivals would usually spend some time in the Training Choir before moving on to the Junior Singers and then to the main concert choir.  There was also a male voice section for boys to progress to when their voice had broken.  While some boys would have left the choir by 18 years often some remained into their adulthood.  The following quotation by a former head chorister embodied the choir's deep pride on producing world class performances from humble beginnings:

Individually we are ordinary, but together we are something quite special.

The Choir is now closed following a change of directorship in 2001 and the subsequent ending of funding by the local education authority due to falling membership numbers and falling standards of performance. 
 

Choirs of children
Musical groups from Manchester
Musical groups established in 1981
English choirs